The Florida Department of Juvenile Justice (FDJJ) is a state agency of Florida that operates juvenile detention centers. Its headquarters are in the Knight Building in Tallahassee.

List of Secretaries

Residential facilities
Residential facilities are divided among the north, central, and south regions. Within the north region, facilities are divided between the west and east areas.

Central Region

Secure:
 Hillsborough Juvenile Detention Center (Tampa)
 Pasco Juvenile Detention Center (Pasco County)
Brevard Juvenile Detention Center (Cocoa)
Manatee Regional Juvenile Detention Center (Bradenton)
Orange Regional Juvenile Detention Center (Orlando)
Pinellas Juvenile Detention Center (Clearwater)

Hardware secure:
 DeSoto Dual Diagnosed Correctional Facility (unincorporated DeSoto County)
 Falkenburg Academy (unincorporated Hillsborough County)
 Gulf Academy (unincorporated Pinellas County)
 Lake Academy (unincorporated Pinellas County)
 Kissimmee Youth Academy (Kissimmee, Florida)
 Palmetto Youth Academy (unincorporated Manatee County)
 Riverside Academy (Tampa)

Staff secure:
 Brevard Group Treatment Home (unincorporated Brevard County)
 Britt Halfway House (St. Petersburg)
 Les Peters Halfway House (Tampa)
 Mandala (unincorporated Pasco County)
 Peace River Youth Academy (unincorporated DeSoto County)
 Price Halfway House for Girls (Fort Myers)
 Youth Environmental Services (unincorporated Hillsborough County)

Non-secure:
 Avon Park Youth Academy (unincorporated Highlands County)
 Columbus Juvenile Residential Facility (unincorporated Hillsborough County)
 Orlando Intensive Youth Academy (unincorporated Orange County)
 Pasco Girls Academy (unincorporated Pasco County)
 Polk Halfway House (Bartow)
 Space Coast Marine Institute (SCMI) (unincorporated Brevard County)

North Region

East Area
Secure:
 Cypress Creek Juvenile Offender Correctional Center (unincorporated Citrus County)
 Daytona Sex Offender Program (unincorporated Volusia County)
 Hastings Youth Academy-Moderate Risk (unincorporated St. Johns County)
 Marion Juvenile Correctional Facility (unincorporated Marion County)
 St. Johns Juvenile Correctional Facility (unincorporated St. Johns County)
 Tiger Serious Habitual Offender Program (SHOP, also the Juvenile Male Serious Habitual Offender Program) (Jacksonville)

Hardware secure:
Staff secure:

Staff secure/Non-secure:
 Alachua Academy (Gainesville)

Non-secure:
 Camp E-Nini-Hassee (unincorporated Citrus County)
 Challenge Youth Residential Facility (or Eckerd Youth Challenge Program (EYCP)) - (unincorporated Hernando County)
 Impact House (Jacksonville)
 Nassau Juvenile Residential Facility (or Nassau Halfway House) (Fernandina Beach)
 Oaks Juvenile Residential Facility (unincorporated Volusia County)
 Project Step 1 & 2 Outward Bound (Unincorporated Nassau County)
 St. Johns Youth Academy (unincorporated St. Johns County)
 Union Juvenile Residential Facility (unincorporated Union County)
 Volusia Halfway House (Daytona Beach)

West Area
Secure:
 North Florida Youth Development Center (NFYDC) (Marianna)
 Okaloosa Youth Development Center (unincorporated Okaloosa County)

Hardware secure:
 Ft. Walton Adolescent Substance Abuse Program (A.S.A.P.) (unincorporated Okaloosa County)
 Gulf Coast Youth Academy (unincorporated Okaloosa County)
 Jackson Juvenile Offender Correctional Center (JJOCC) (Marianna)
 Monticello New Life (Monticello)
 Panther Success Center (unincorporated Hamilton County)
 Walton Youth Development Center (unincorporated Walton County)

Staff secure:
 JoAnn Bridges Academy (unincorporated Madison County)
 Juvenile Unit for Specialized Treatment (J.U.S.T.) (unincorporated Liberty County)
 Milton Girls Juvenile Residential Facility (unincorporated Santa Rosa County)
 Pensacola Boys Base (unincorporated Escambia County)
 Residential Alternative for the Mentally Challenged (RAM-C Program) (unincorporated Madison County)
 Santa Rosa Youth Academy (unincorporated Santa Rosa County)
 Twin Oaks Vocational 14-18 (unincorporated Madison County)
 Twin Oaks Vocational II

Environmentally secure:
 West Florida Wilderness Institute (WFWI) (unincorporated Holmes County)

Non-secure:
 Bristol Youth Academy (Bristol)
 Camp E-Ma-Chamee (unincorporated Santa Rosa County)
 Crestview Sex Offender Program (unincorporated Okaloosa County)
 DOVE Intensive Mental Health (IMH) Program (unincorporated Jackson County)
 DOVE Vocational Academy (unincorporated Jackson County)
 Okaloosa Borderline Development Disability Program (unincorporated Okaloosa County)
 Okaloosa Youth Academy (unincorporated Okaloosa County)

South Region
Secure:
 Broward Juvenile Detention Center (Fort Lauderdale)
 Palm Beach Juvenile Detention Center (West Palm Beach)
Monroe Juvenile Detention Center (Key West)
Collier Juvenile Detention Center (East Naples)
SWFL Regional Juvenile Detention Center (Fort Myers)
Miami-Dade Regional Juvenile Detention Center (Miami)
St Lucie Regional Juvenile Detention Center (Fort Pierce)

Hardware secure:
 Dade Juvenile Residential Facility (unincorporated Miami-Dade County)
Miami Youth Academy
Okeechobee Juvenile Offender Corrections Center (Okeechobee)

Staff secure:

 Pompano Substance Abuse Treatment Center (Pompano Beach)
Palm Beach Youth Academy  (West Palm Beach)

Non-secure
 Broward Youth Treatment Center (Pembroke Pines)
 Miami Halfway House (Kendall, unincorporated Miami-Dade County)
Okeechobee Girls Academy (unincorporated Okeechobee County)
Okeechobee Intensive Halfway House (OIHH) 
WINGS (Women in Need of Greater Strength) for Life (Goulds, unincorporated Miami-Dade County)

Former
 Dozier School for Boys

See also

 Youth incarceration in the United States

References

External links
 Florida Department of Juvenile Justice

State agencies of Florida
Florida
Florida
1994 establishments in Florida
Government agencies established in 1994